Adisumarmo  Airport Rail Link is an airport rail link service in Central Java, Indonesia. The service was built to cut travel time from Surakarta city center to Adisumarmo International Airport. It is operated by Kereta Api Indonesia (KAI) because its subsidiary KAI Bandara doesn't have stakes owned by Angkasa Pura I. 

The Adisumarmo ARS is the fourth airport rail link in Indonesia connecting passengers between the city centre and airport after Kualanamu ARS, Soekarno–Hatta ARS and Minangkabau ARS. The train line between   station and  opened on 29 December 2019. The trains are manufactured by INKA.

Background
A new railway is being constructed to the airport. The  airport rail will connect Solo Balapan Station to Adi Soemarmo Airport. Construction of the airport rail line consists of two segments: segment 1, from Solo Balapan Station to Solo Baru Station along  which is the existing railway track. By using this airport train, the distance from Solo to Adi Sumarmo Airport will only take about 15 minutes. The airport railway opened on 29 December 2019.

Stations

See also

Adisumarmo International Airport
Kualanamu Airport Rail Link
Soekarno–Hatta Airport Rail Link
Minangkabau Airport Rail Link
Yogyakarta International Airport Rail Link

References

Airport rail links in Indonesia
Rapid transit in Indonesia
Rail infrastructure in Indonesia
Passenger rail transport in Indonesia
Transport in Central Java